Sir John William Kaye  (3 June 1814 – 24 July 1876) was a British military historian, civil servant and army officer. His major works on military history include a three-volume work on The History of the Sepoy War in India. This work was revised later by George Bruce Malleson and published in six volumes in 1890 as Kaye and Malleson's History of the Indian Mutiny.

Biography 
The second son of Charles Kaye, a solicitor, and Eliza, daughter of Hugh Atkins, he was born in London on 3 June 1814 and baptized on 30 June 1814. He was educated at Eton College (1823–1826) and at the Royal Military College, Addiscombe (1831–1832).

From 1832 to 1841 he was an officer in the Bengal Artillery commissioned on 14 December 1832 as a Second-Lieutenant and on 19 August 1840 promoted to Lieutenant. During his time in the Army he began following literary pursuits both in India and in Britain.

In 1839 he married Mary Catherine (1813–1893), daughter of Thomas Puckle of Surrey. He resigned his commission in the army on 1 April 1841 and began to write for newspapers such as the Bengal Hurkaru, which he edited. In 1844 he started the Calcutta Review and contributed about 50 articles to it while also writing a novel based in Afghanistan.

In 1845 Kaye returned to England to follow a professional literary career. He worked on his History of the War in Afghanistan, an account of the First Anglo-Afghan War. The book was well received: John Clark Marshman regarded it as "the most interesting of all works which have hitherto appeared on British Indian history".

Kaye entered the Home Civil Service of the East India Company in 1856. As John Stuart Mill was promoted to the post of Examiner of Indian correspondence, Kaye succeeded him as Political Assistant in the Examiner Department at East India House. During this time, he wrote the History of the Sepoy War in India, his history of the Indian Rebellion of 1857. It is considered a "well-ordered and comprehensive narrative". This work was later revised and continued by George Bruce Malleson as Kaye and Malleson's History of the Indian Mutiny and published in six volumes. It was completed in 1890. The Oxford Dictionary of National Biography considers Kaye's History of the Sepoy War in India still to be a standard work.

When in 1858 the government of India was transferred to the British crown, Kaye succeeded as Secretary in the Political and Secret Department of the Office of the Secretary of State for India. In 1866 he became a Fellow of the Royal Society. In the 1871 Birthday Honours he was made a Knight Commander of the Order of the Star of India (KCSI).

After retiring from the India Office in 1874 due to ill health, he died in London at his home at Rose Hill on 24 July 1876. An obituary in the Athenaeum praised him as a "household word in the East".

Published works 
  A novel in three volumes, published anonymously.
 
 
  A novel in one volume, published anonymously.
 
 
 
 
 
 
 
 
 
 
 
  The History of the Sepoy War in India (1864–1876), was later revised and continued by George Bruce Malleson and published in six volumes (1888–1889). A transcription of this later work is available online.
 
 
 
 
 
Kaye further edited several works dealing with Indian affairs and was a frequent contributor to periodicals.

Awards 
 1866: Fellow of the Royal Society (FRS)
 1871: Knight Commander of the Order of the Star of India (KCSI).

Bibliography

References

External links 
 
 Thesis by Christina Lee Fairchild (2017) "Because we were too English:" John Kaye and the 1857 Indian Rebellion. University of Maryland.

1814 births
1876 deaths
People educated at Eton College
Fellows of the Royal Society
Bengal Artillery officers
British military historians
Indian magazine founders
Indian magazine editors
19th-century British journalists
British male journalists
19th-century British male writers
Knights Commander of the Order of the Star of India